Melvin Lenzo Watkins (born November 15, 1954) is an American college basketball coach and former player. He has also been the associate head coach at the University of Missouri. He served as interim head coach during the end of the 2006 season, but returned to his former position when new coach Mike Anderson was hired.

Early years
Born in Reidsville, North Carolina, Melvin Watkins attended Reidsville High School.  Watkins started for the Reidsville High basketball team for from 1970 to 1973. As a senior, he was named team captain and, after helping the team earn the state championship, was named a 1973 high school All-American.

Playing career
Watkins played college basketball at University of North Carolina at Charlotte, where he was the point guard and team captain of the Charlotte 49ers' 1977 Final Four team. While at Charlotte, Watkins made a point to complete his education, earning a B.A. in Economics in 1977.

Watkins was drafted in the fourth round of the 1977 NBA draft by the Buffalo Braves, but never played in the NBA.

Coaching career

Charlotte
In 1978, Watkins became an assistant coach for Charlotte's head coach Mike Pratt, and would continue as an assistant with Charlotte through eighteen seasons and three coaches: Pratt, Hal Wissel, and Jeff Mullins. When Mullins retired in 1996, Watkins was promoted and became the seventh head coach in school history and the first Charlotte alumnus to hold the position.

In his first season as head coach Watkins was named the Conference USA Ray Meyer Coach of the Year. He compiled an overall 42-20 record in his two seasons as head coach, bringing the 49ers to the NCAA tournament twice, reaching the second round each year.

Texas A&M
At the end of the 1998 season, Watkins accepted an offer to become the head coach at Texas A&M University, a school which had enjoyed only one winning season in the previous eight years.  During the next six years, Watkins failed to live up to the success he enjoyed at Charlotte, achieving an unimpressive 60-112 record.

In one of the team's more controversial games of Watkins's A&M career, A&M beat Texas Tech 88-86 by sinking a basket at the buzzer.  As soon as the basket was declared good and A&M given the victory, Watkins shepherded his team off of the court and onto the team bus, without allowing them time to change.  After watching a replay, officials declared that the basket had come after the buzzer, but Watkins refused to allow his team back on the court to play overtime, and after thirty minutes of discussion, the officials finally declared that A&M had won.  The team left so fast that they forgot to bring their radio crew, leaving Watkins to conduct the post-game news conference from a cell phone while he was on the team's bus.

The low point came in 2003–04, when the Aggies put up a 7-22 record, going 0-16 in the Big 12 Conference. Watkins was pressured into resigning during the Big 12 Tournament in 2004.  Watkins would not coach for a team that beat Texas A&M again until 2013, when Arkansas snapped his own personal 26 game losing streak in games where Texas A&M was playing and he was coaching. He attributed much of the team's poor showing to the youth of the team's very talented recruits, which included freshman Acie Law IV and sophomores Marlon Pompey and Antoine Wright, and under his replacement Billy Gillispie, Watkins's players developed into a very strong team, earning an 8-8 conference record and a trip to the NIT in 2004–2005.

During his tenure at Texas A&M, Watkins was noted for his outstanding recruiting, bringing eight National Top 100 recruits to the campus, including Antoine Wright the school's tenth all-time leading scorer. He also placed a large emphasis on academics, turning out 15 Academic All-Big 12 first or second team members during his six years, and ensuring that fourteen of the seventeen players who completed their eligibility at A&M went on to graduate (the remaining three players are playing professional basketball in overseas leagues).

Missouri
After tendering his resignation at Texas A&M, Watkins accepted the job as associate head coach at the University of Missouri on June 21, 2004.

Watkins was named interim head coach at Mizzou following Quin Snyder's firing on February 10, 2006, with the Tigers at a record of 10-11 and suffering from a six-game losing streak.  Watkins led the team to a 2-4 record during the remainder of their conference play.  Following the hiring of new head coach Mike Anderson, Watkins resumed his title of associate head coach.

Arkansas
On April 6, 2011, Watkins and other fellow assistants followed Anderson to the University of Arkansas, where Anderson had become head coach. After eight seasons, Watkins was dismissed, along with the rest of the Arkansas staff at the conclusion of the 2019 season.

Personal life
Watkins is married to the former Burrell Bryant.  They have three children, Manuale, Marcus, and Keia.  Marcus played for his father at both Texas A&M and the University of Missouri.

Watkins is active in Habitat for Humanity and has served as the co-chair of a battered women's shelter.

Head coaching record

*Interim coach after Quin Snyder resigned; complete record for the 2005–06 season was 12–16 (5–11 Big 12).

References

External links
 Arkansas Razorbacks bio
 Texas A&M Aggies bio
 Missouri Tigers bio

1954 births
Living people
African-American basketball coaches
African-American basketball players
American men's basketball players
Arkansas Razorbacks men's basketball coaches
Basketball coaches from North Carolina
Basketball players from North Carolina
Buffalo Braves draft picks
Charlotte 49ers men's basketball coaches
Charlotte 49ers men's basketball players
College men's basketball head coaches in the United States
Missouri Tigers men's basketball coaches
Point guards
Texas A&M Aggies men's basketball coaches
21st-century African-American people
20th-century African-American sportspeople